Suzanne Collins (born 1962) is an American television writer and novelist.

Suzanne Collins may also refer to:
Suzanne Collins (actress) (born 1978), English actress
Murder of Suzanne Marie Collins (1966–1985), American marine who was murdered

See also
Susan Collins (disambiguation)